The Queries (or simply Queries) is the third book to English physicist Isaac Newton's Opticks, with various numbers of Query sections or "question" sections (up to 31, depending on edition), expanded on from 1704 to 1718, that contains Newton's final thoughts on the future puzzles of science. Query 31, in particular, launched affinity chemistry and the dozens of affinity tables that were made in the 18th century, based on Newton's description of affinity gradients.

Overview
Opticks concludes with a set of "Queries." In the first edition, these were sixteen such Queries; that number was increased in the Latin edition, published in 1706, and then in the revised English edition, published in 1717/18. The first set of Queries were brief, but the later ones became short essays, filling many pages.  In the fourth edition of 1730, there were 31 Queries, and it was the famous "31st Query" that, over the next two hundred years, stimulated a great deal of speculation and development on theories of chemical affinity.

These Queries, especially the later ones, deal with a wide range of physical phenomena, far transcending any narrow interpretation of the subject matter of "optics." They concern the nature and transmission of heat; the possible cause of gravity; electrical phenomena; the nature of chemical action; the way in which God created matter in "the Beginning;" the proper way to do science; and even the ethical conduct of human beings. These Queries are not really questions in the ordinary sense. They are almost all posed in the negative, as rhetorical questions. That is, Newton does not ask whether light "is" or "may be" a "body." Rather, he declares: "Is not Light a Body?" Not only does this form indicate that Newton had an answer, but that it may go on for many pages. Clearly, as Stephen Hales (a firm Newtonian of the early eighteenth century) declared, this was Newton's mode of explaining "by Query."

Other scientists followed Newton's lead. They saw that he had been setting forth a kind of exploratory natural philosophy in which the primary source of knowledge was experiment. This Newtonian tradition of experimental natural philosophy was different from the one based on mathematical deductions. In this sense, Opticks established a kind of Newtonianism that in the eighteenth century rivalled in importance the mathematical natural philosophy of the Principia. Some of the primary adepts in this new philosophy were such prominent figures as Benjamin Franklin, Antoine-Laurent Lavoisier, and James Black.

Transcription of text 

Books by Isaac Newton
1704 books